Daniel Hewitt is a British journalist and presenter currently working for ITV News as a political correspondent.

Career
Daniel joined ITV News Central in 2011. In 2012 he was named Midlands Newcomer of the Year, before moving to ITV Granada as a Sports Reporter. In 2013 he became Granada Reports's Political Correspondent, and later that year he was named North West TV Journalist of the Year at the O2 Media Awards.

In 2018 Daniel was named the Royal Television Society North West Journalist of the Year. He has also been nominated for two Royal Television Society awards for his coverage of the Khuram Shaikh murder and his coverage of the 2015 General Election respectively. In 2018 his investigation into child poverty in the North of England was nominated for The Orwell Prize.

In 2016 he left Granada Reports and joined the ITV News political unit in Westminster, covering Yorkshire, Tyne Tees and the Scottish Borders. He returned to Granada Reports in 2017, but left Granada Reports again in 2018 to join ITV Network News.

He presents Calling Peston: the ITV News Politics Podcast, which has been twice nominated for Podcast of the Year, and US Election podcast ‘Will Trump Win?’ with ITV News’ Washington Correspondent Robert Moore, which was named 2021 Podcast of the Year at The Drum Online Media Awards.

In 2022 Daniel was named Royal Television Society Specialist Journalist of the Year. His Documentary ‘Surviving Squalor: Britain’s Housing Shame’ won Best Documentary at the Association of International Broadcasters awards. His work investigating social housing has earned him a string of award nominations. 

He also was called to Parliament to give evidence to MPs on the findings of the investigation.

Daniel supports West Bromwich Albion.

References 

British journalists
Living people
Year of birth missing (living people)
People from Burntwood